Ulzana is a 1974 western film directed by Gottfried Kolditz and starring Gojko Mitic as Ulzana, Renate Blume and Rolf Hoppe. It is a Red Western, made as a co-production between East Germany, Romania and the Soviet Union.

The film's sets were designed by the art director Heinz Röske. It was shot on location in Romania and Uzbekistan.

Cast

See also
 Ulzana's Raid (another film featuring the historical figure of Ulzana

References

Bibliography 
 Mariana Ivanova. Cinema of Collaboration: DEFA Coproductions and International Exchange in Cold War Europe. Berghahn Books, 2019.

External links 
 

1974 films
East German films
Soviet historical drama films
Romanian historical drama films
German Western (genre) films
German historical drama films
1974 Western (genre) films
1970s historical films
1970s German-language films
Films directed by Gottfried Kolditz
Films set in the 19th century
Ostern films
Mosfilm films
1970s German films